The Journal of Functional Programming is a peer-reviewed scientific journal covering the design, implementation, and application of functional programming languages, spanning the range from mathematical theory to industrial practice. Topics covered include functional languages and extensions, implementation techniques, reasoning and proof, program transformation and synthesis, type systems, type theory, language-based security, memory management, parallelism and applications. The journal is of interest to computer scientists, software engineers, programming language researchers, and mathematicians interested in the logical foundations of programming. Philip Wadler was editor-in-chief from 1990 to 2004. The journal is indexed in Zentralblatt MATH.

As of 2022, the journal is published as open access: the journal articles are available online without a subscription. Author's institutions are expected to cover the journal costs: as of 2022, the article processing charge is GBP 1,250 per article.

See also 
International Conference on Functional Programming
Higher-Order and Symbolic Computation

References

External links 
 

Bimonthly journals
Cambridge University Press academic journals
Computer science education in the United Kingdom
Computer science in the United Kingdom
Computer science journals
English-language journals
Functional programming
Publications established in 1991